Kakusandha (Pāli), or Krakucchaṃda in Sanskrit, is one of the ancient Buddhas whose biography is chronicled in chapter 22 of the Buddhavaṃsa, one of the books of the Pali Canon.

According to Theravāda Buddhist tradition, Kakusandha is the twenty-fifth of the twenty-nine named Buddhas, the fourth of the Seven Buddhas of Antiquity, and the first of the five Buddhas of the present kalpa.

The present kalpa is called the bhadrakalpa (Auspicious aeon). The five Buddhas of the present kalpa are:
Kakusandha (the first Buddha of the bhadrakalpa)
Koṇāgamana (the second Buddha of the bhadrakalpa)
Kassapa (the third Buddha of the bhadrakalpa)
Gautama (the fourth and present Buddha of the bhadrakalpa)
Maitreya (the fifth and future Buddha of the bhadrakalpa)

Life
Kakusandha was born in Khemavati Park in Khemavati according to the Theravada tradition. His father was Aggidatta,a chaplain of the king Khemankara of Khemavati. His mother was Visakha. His wife was Virochamana (also known as Rocani); he had a son, Uttara (son of Kakusandha). Asoka visited Gotihawa, Nepal when he visited Lumbini, Nepal and installed a stone pillar and inscribed his visit in the pillar. There is also a stupa in Gothihawa. Therefore, it is generally accepted due to the pillar that stupa is associated with the nirvana of Kakusandha Buddha.

Kakusandha lived for four thousand years in the household in three palaces: Ruci, Suruci and Vaddhana (or Rativaddhana). At the age of four thousand, he renounced the worldly life while riding on a chariot. He practised austerities for eight months. Before attaining enlightenment, he had accepted some milk-rice from the daughter of the Brahmin Vajirindha of the village Suchirindha, as well as grass for his seat from the yavapalaka Subhadda. He attained enlightenment under a sirisa tree, then delivered his first sermon to the assembly of eighty-four thousand monks in a park near Makila.

Kakusandha performed the twin miracle under a sala tree, at the gates of Kannakujja. Among his converts was a fierce yaksha named Naradeva. Kakusandha kept the fast-day (uposatha) every year.

His chief disciples were Vidhura and Sanjiva among the monks, and Sama and Champa among the nuns. His personal attendant was Buddhija. Acchuta and Samana among the men, and Nanda and Sunanda among the women were his chief lay-supporters. Acchuta built a monastery for Kakusandha Buddha on the same site, which was later chosen by Anathapindika for Jetavana Arama for Gautama Buddha.

According to the Samyutta Nikaya (ii.194), the Vepulla peak of Rajgir was then called Pachinvamsa; and the people of the region Tivara.

Kakusandha's body was forty cubits in height, and he died at the age of forty thousand years in Khemavati. 
The stupa erected over his relics was one league high.

The bodhisattva who was to become Siddhartha Gautama was born as King Khema during the time of Kakusandha. Kakusandha was the Buddha who foretold that King Khema, who offered him alms with robes and medicines, would become the Gautama Buddha in the future.

See also
Bhadrakalpikasutra

References

Buddhas